Fashak or Feshk or Fashk may refer to:

Feshk, Markazi
Fashak, Qazvin
Feshk Rural District, former name of Talkh Ab Rural District, in Markazi Province